DR P7 Mix was one of DR's digital radio stations in Denmark. It launched on 6 June 2011 as the third of five new digital-only stations. As of September 2019, it has been slated for closure.

History 
In November 2010, DR announced it would significantly lower the number of digital radio stations in its line-up from 23 to between 10-12. The new line-up of digital stations were announced in January 2011. In the new line-up, DR Hit and DR Soft were to be replaced by P7 Mix which unlike the former channels would have presenters.

On 1 October 2017 P7 Mix became available on DAB+ radio when a nationwide switch-over took place.

Presenters 
 Christina Bjørn
 Christine Milton
 Henrik Milling
 Jonas Gülstorff
 Michael Bernhard
 Mikkel Bagger
 Nicolai Molbech
 Sandie Westh

Notes

Radio stations in Denmark
Radio stations established in 2011
Radio stations disestablished in 2020
Defunct radio stations
Defunct mass media in Denmark